The 1999–2000 season was the 93rd season in the existence of RC Lens and the club's 11th consecutive season in the top flight of French football. In addition to the domestic league, Lens participated in this season's editions of the Coupe de France, the Coupe de la Ligue and the UEFA Cup. The season covered the period from 1 July 1999 to 30 June 2000.

Season summary
Lens reached the UEFA Cup semi-final before being eliminated by Arsenal.

First team squad
Squad at end of season

Transfers

In
 Olivier Dacourt - Everton
 Bruno Rodriguez - Paris Saint-Germain

Competitions

French Division 1

League table

Results summary

Results by round

UEFA Cup

First round

Second round

Third round

Fourth round

Quarter-finals

Semi-finals

Notes and references

Notes

References

RC Lens seasons
Lens